Stevan Anđelković (born 8 February 1988) is a Serbian recording artist and actor. In 2004, he gained relevance as the runner-up in the first season of Zvezde Granda. After a hiatus, he presented himself to the Serbian audience as an actor, playing the role of Perhan in the 2010 re-release of the Serbian film Time of the Gypsies.

Early life
Anđelković, a Vučje native, showed interest in music at a very young age, thus in his early youth started learning to play the piano and harmonica. Gaining the ability to play it at a semi-professional level at the Belgrade music school, at 16 years of age, he participated in the first season of Zvezde Granda, where he reached second place, amassing popularity across Serbia.

In 2010, he starred as Perhan in the rendition of the cult Yugoslav film Time of the Gypsies, directed by Emir Kusturica, which is a role originally played by Davor Dujmović. He performed alongside Milica Todorović, who played Azra, a character originally played by Sinolička Trpkova. The musical interpretation gained massive acclaim due to the new elements it blended in to the movie classic.

Anđelković resides in Belgrade, and is close friends with co-star Milica Todorović.

Tvoje lice zvuči poznato
One of his more notable projects was in late 2017, when he was a contestant in the fourth season of Tvoje lice zvuči poznato, the Serbian version of Your Face Sounds Familiar. Out of the 12 weeks, he only won once having impersonated Oliver Dragojević, but he was also praised for his performances impersonating Toma Zdravković, Toše Proeski, Emina Jahović and Rasta. In the finals, he claimed the victory of the entire season as Elvis Presley in December 2017, performing "Always On My Mind" and "Jailhouse Rock".

Discography

Albums
 Startujmo (2005)

Singles & EPs 
 Pilula tona / Šta Voziš (2017)
 Šta Voziš? (2017)

References

1988 births
Living people
Musicians from Leskovac
Grand Production artists
Serbian turbo-folk singers
Serbian tenors
Serbian multi-instrumentalists
Your Face Sounds Familiar winners